Ficus brachypoda is a tree in the family Moraceae native to northern Australia. It is a banyan of the genus Ficus which contains around 750 species worldwide in warm climates, including the edible fig (Ficus carica).

Ficus brachypoda is likely a species complex. A new species Ficus desertorum was split from the group.

References

External links

Wilde, Brendan (2021). "Hiding in plain sight, Ficus desertorum (Moraceae), a new species of rock fig for Central Australia". Telopea. 24: 283–301. doi:10.7751/telopea14668. ISSN 2200-4025.

Rosales of Australia
Trees of Australia
Flora of Queensland
brachypoda
Drought-tolerant trees
Ornamental trees
Garden plants of Australia
Taxa named by Friedrich Anton Wilhelm Miquel